The Pak 57 was a Swiss anti-tank gun used by the Swiss army.

Development
After the second World War, Switzerland sought to retrofit its armed forces, their anti tank guns at the time were mostly older German 75mm guns that were not sufficient for their needs. The Pak 57 and Pak 50 designs were the first domestic designs intended to replace them. The Pak 57, though slightly heavier than the Pak 50, had a very short barrel for an anti-tank gun and was much lighter than foreign designs such as the 90 mm Gun M1/M2/M3.

Both the Pak 50 and Pak 57 served with the Swiss fusilier battalions.

Notes

References

Artillery of Switzerland
Anti-tank guns of the Cold War